A Song of Kentucky is a 1929 American lost Pre-Code romantic drama film produced and distributed by the Fox Film Corporation. It is an early sound film with full dialogue. It was directed by Lewis Seiler, and stars Lois Moran and Dorothy Burgess.

Cast
Lois Moran - Lee Coleman
Joseph Wagstaff - Jerry Reavis
Dorothy Burgess - Nancy Morgan
Douglas Gilmore - Kane Pitcairn
Herman Bing - Jake Kleinschmidt
Hedda Hopper - Mrs. Coleman
Bert Woodruff - Steve

References

External links
A Song of Kentucky at IMDb.com
A Song of Kentucky at tcm.com
allmovie/synopsis
Dutch language lobby poster

1929 films
Lost American films
Films directed by Lewis Seiler
Fox Film films
American romantic drama films
1929 romantic drama films
American black-and-white films
1920s American films
Silent romantic drama films